Saruba Colley (born February 5, 1989, in Sibanor) is a Gambian sprinter.  She competed in the 100 metres competition at the 2012 Summer Olympics; she ran the preliminaries in 12.21 seconds, qualifying her for Round 1, and Round 1 in 12.06 seconds, which set a Gambian national record but did not qualify her for the semifinals.

References

1989 births
Living people
Gambian female sprinters
Olympic athletes of the Gambia
Athletes (track and field) at the 2012 Summer Olympics
Athletes (track and field) at the 2010 Commonwealth Games
Commonwealth Games competitors for the Gambia
Olympic female sprinters